The Lancaster Pistol was a multi-barrelled (2 or 4 barrels) handgun produced in England in the mid-late 19th century, chambered in a variety of centrefire pistol calibres—chiefly .38 S&W, .450 Adams, .455 Webley, and .577 inch. The designer, London gunsmith Charles Lancaster, began his career in 1847 as an apprentice to his father, Charles Sr. During the 1850s he invented oval bore rifling and the gas check bullet.

Description
It was a modernised version of the pepper-box pistol popular in the early-mid 19th century. Unlike these earlier guns which had percussion cap ignition, the Lancaster was chambered for the more modern brass cartridges. The unique oval rifling also enabled it to fire .410 shotgun shells. It had a faster rate of fire than the standard-issue Adams revolver and was often fitted with a Tranter-type trigger to overcome the heavy pull of the revolving striker.

Sometimes classified as a Howdah pistol, the Lancaster pistol enjoyed popularity with British officers in India and Africa during the British Raj owing to its faster rate of fire and increased reliability over contemporary revolvers. It was highly prized by hunters and explorers for close range defense against big game such as tigers or cape buffalo. Unlike revolvers, it does not leak gas when fired since there is no gap between the chamber and the barrel. One rare variant, made for the Maharajah of Rewa as a hunting weapon, took the form of a four barreled rifle.

Use in Sudan
Its ammunition had greater stopping power than the contemporary Beaumont–Adams and Colt Navy revolvers, making it ideal for colonial warfare. When facing charging tribesmen like the Zulus or Ansar (the so-called Sudanese Dervishes), more modern ammunition tended to go straight through the enemy who would keep going. What was needed was a heavy lead bullet that would lodge in their body and bring them down. One famous user was the photographer and film maker Lieutenant Colonel John Montague Benett Stanford (1870-1947), who killed a fanatical assegai-wielding Sudanese Ansar with a Lancaster pistol while working as a war correspondent at the Battle of Omdurman.

It was eventually displaced by the various Webley revolvers in the late 19th century as revolvers became more reliable and faster to reload, thus removing many of the advantages of the multi-barrel design. A few were still in use as late as World War I, and they were well known to be solidly built and easy to maintain.

In popular culture
A double-barreled Lancaster howdah pistol with a unique spring-loaded blade is the weapon of the big-game hunter Remington in The Ghost and the Darkness.

The Lancaster pistol exists as the Howdah Pistol in the 2016 video game Battlefield 1.

References

Black-powder pistols
Multiple-barrel firearms
Pistols of the United Kingdom
Victorian-era weapons of the United Kingdom
Hunting equipment